Violin Sonata No. 3 may refer to:

 Violin Sonata No. 3 (Bantock) by Granville Bantock
 Violin Sonata No. 3 (Beethoven)
 Violin Sonata No. 3 (Brahms)
 Violin Sonata No. 3 (Enescu)
 Violin Sonata No. 3 (Grieg)
 Violin Sonata No. 3 (Guarnieri) by Camargo Guarnieri
 Violin Sonata No. 3 (Hill)
 Violin Sonata No. 3 (Medtner)
 Violin Sonata No. 3 (Mozart)
 Violin Sonata No. 3 (Villa-Lobos) by Heitor Villa-Lobos
 Violin Sonata No. 3 (Ysaÿe)